Eileen Baldry  is an Australian criminologist and social justice advocate. She is Deputy Vice-Chancellor Equity Diversity and Inclusion and Professor of Criminology at the University of New South Wales (UNSW).

Academic career 
Baldry completed a BA, Dip Ed and Dip TEFL at the University of Sydney. She graduated from the UNSW in 1992 with a PhD on "The development of the health consumer movement and its effect on value changes and health policy in Australia". 

Baldry has been employed by UNSW since 1987, initially in casual research and teaching roles. Following graduation with her PhD she became lecturer (1993–1999), senior lecturer (1999–2006), associate professor (2006–2010) and finally Professor of Criminology in 2011. She was appointed inaugural Deputy Vice-Chancellor Inclusion and Diversity at UNSW in July 2017, the first woman to fill a DVC position at the university.

Since 1995 Baldry has filled a number of NSW government and community positions, and as of January 2021 is Chair of the Coalition for Intellectual Disability in the Criminal Justice System (2005–), Chair of the NSW Homelessness Expert Advisory Committee and Monitoring and Evaluation Group Homelessness Reform (2012–), Deputy Chair of the Disability Council NSW (2015–), Director, Public Interest Advocacy Centre Ltd (2015–) and National Co-Chair Anti Poverty Week (2017–).

She was a member of the board of the Centre for Health Research in Criminal Justice with the NSW Department of Health (2005–2010), expert advisor to the Juvenile Justice Transitional Program in the NSW Department of Corrective Services (2009–2011) and president of NSW Council of Social Service (2010–2014).

Honours and recognition 
2009: NSW Justice Medal by the Law and Justice Foundation of NSW.
2016: named one of the Australian Financial Review/Westpac 100 most influential women in Australia
2017: Fellow of the Academy of the Social Sciences in Australia
2018: Fellow of the Royal Society of New South Wales
2021: appointed Officer of the Order of Australia in the 2021 Australia Day Honours,  for "distinguished service to tertiary education, to criminology and social welfare policy, and as an advocate for diversity, equity and inclusion"

Selected works

Books

Articles

References

External links 
Eileen Baldry at UNSW Sydney

Living people
Year of birth missing (living people)
University of Sydney alumni
University of New South Wales alumni
Academic staff of the University of New South Wales
Officers of the Order of Australia
Fellows of the Academy of the Social Sciences in Australia
Australian criminologists
Australian women criminologists